Der Herr im Haus is a 1940 German film directed by Heinz Helbig.

The film is also known as A Man in the House (Belgian English title) and The Landlord in Australia.

Plot summary

Cast 
Hans Moser as Napoleon Bonaparte
Maria Andergast as Christa Schellenberg
Elise Aulinger as Haushälterin
Leo Slezak as Wolfram Schellenberg
Hermann Brix as Klaus Frank
Thea Aichbichler as Mrs. Anger
Hans Junkermann as Egon von Schwarzendorff
Julia Serda as Amalie von Schwarzendorff
Rudolf Schündler as Ferdinand von Schwarzendorff
Fritz Odemar as Menarek
Paul Westermeier as Karl
Friedrich Ulmer as Bongelstedt
Egon Brosig as Heller
Karl Skraup as Oberkellner
Hans Schulz as Sturm
Ludwig Schmid-Wildy as Lakai
 as Antiquitätenhändler
Klaus Pohl as Granseder
Meta Weber
Fanny Schreck
Anita Düwell
Else Kündinger
Rudolf Stadler
Senta Esser
Kurt Uhlig
Vladimír Pospísil-Born
Josef Hagen
Maria von Krüdener

Soundtrack

External links 

1940 films
Films of Nazi Germany
1940 comedy films
1940s German-language films
German black-and-white films
German comedy films
1940s German films